The Chiefdom of Ameca is the name given to a pre-Columbian state that encompassed the Valley of Ameca in central Jalisco, Mexico. The word Ameca is of Cazcan origin and means "above the water".

History
Xoxouhqui Tequani (meaning "brave lion") was a feared indigenous chief from a far, unspecified coastal region who settled the area with his people circa 1325. He is attributed as the founder of the Chiefdom of Ameca and its dynasty which spanned five generations. Xoxouhqui Tequani never became a vassal of his powerful comrade Caltzoncin, chief of Pátzcuaro, because of his bravery and expert warfare. Xoxouhqui Tequani's sons, grandsons, great-grandsons, and great-great grandsons succeeded him as chiefs of Ameca, until 1522. Huitzil, Xoxouhqui Tequani's descendant, was the last of the chiefs of Ameca. His great-grandson, don Martín Cortés, became governor of Ameca during the late 16th century.

Conquest
The seat of Amecatl was discovered by Juan de Añesta in 1522 who arrived barefoot and alone with a sword in his hand.  The residents of Amecatl surrendered peacefully to the conquistador because they thought he was the son of the sun, as their ancestors had predicted that he would come to conquer and that all would be subject to him and pay tribute.

Until 1529, Fray Antonio de Cuélla along with other missionaries and Spaniards settled in the town of Amecatl and built an adobe chapel, royal house, plaza, jail, hotel, and houses in what is now central Ameca, Jalisco.

Though the population of Ameca spoke the Cazcan and Totonac languages, they generally used Nahuatl (mexicano).

Gastronomy
Maize, which was either boiled or roasted, was the staple food of the Amecans; it was the main ingredient for their cuisine which included tamales (tamalli) and atole (cacalotl or izquitl). Their diet also included pumpkins, beans, chili peppers, and chives. They hunted deer, rabbits, fowl, small dogs (chichitones), snakes, mice, badgers, and big cats; the game meat was cooked in holes with many pebbles. Pulque, an intoxicating milk-like drink from the maguey plant, was a popular beverage. They gathered red and yellow plums, mezquites, zapotes, guamúchiles, avocados, guavas, and bananas.

References

Bibliography

External links
Health during the Conquest-period
Historical description of the region

States and territories established in 1325
States and territories disestablished in 1524
History of Mexico
Former countries in North America
Former chiefdoms in North America